William P "Will" Fitzpatrick (born 1961) is an Irish-born retired American politician. A Democrat, he served from 1993-97 in the Rhode Island Senate.

Born and raised in Ireland, he was educated by the Roman Catholic Patrician Brothers before emigrating to the United States. A computer programmer by trade, Fitzpatrick ran for the Rhode Island Senate from the 11th district in 1992, comprising parts of Cranston. He defeated seven-term incumbent David H. Sholes in the Democratic primary election held on September 15, 1992 and went on to win the general election. A resident of Edgewood, he served two terms, holding office from January 1993 until January 1997. He was not a candidate for re-election to a third term in November 1996 and was succeeded by Elizabeth H. Roberts, who went on to be elected Lieutenant Governor.

Sexual orientation
A gay man, Fitzpatrick confirmed his sexual orientation to the media weeks after his election in November 1992. He was the first ever openly gay member of the Rhode Island Legislature.

Personal life
Fitzpatrick resides in California.

References

1961 births
Gay politicians
Irish emigrants to the United States
LGBT state legislators in Rhode Island
Living people
Naturalized citizens of the United States
People from Cranston, Rhode Island
Place of birth missing (living people)
Democratic Party Rhode Island state senators